Silesian Lowlands (or Silesian Plains) are lowlands located in Silesia, Poland in Central Europe. A small part is located in the Czech Republic. It is part of the Central European Plain. Silesian Lowlands is a physical-geographical macroregion. It is the warmest region in Poland.

Geomorphological mesoregions 
 Oleśnica Plain
 Racibórz Basin
 Głubczyce Plateau / Opava Hilly Land
 Opole Plain
 Niemodlin Plain

Major cities and towns 
Population figures as of 2018
 Wrocław (640,648)
 Opole (128,137)
 Kędzierzyn-Koźle (61,062)
 Opava (55,996)
 Racibórz (54,882)
 Nysa (44,044)
 Oleśnica (37,242)
 Brzeg (35,930)
 Oława (32,927)
 Lubliniec (23,818)
 Kluczbork (23,661)
 Prudnik (21,170)
 Pyskowice (18,456)
 Namysłów (16,490)
 Krapkowice (16,381)
 Jelcz-Laskowice (15,792)

See also
Silesian Highlands
Silesian-Lusatian Lowlands
Silesian Foothills
Silesian-Moravian Foothills

Geography of Silesia
Plains of Poland